Chandrakauns is a raga in Hindustani classical music. It is also used in tail pieces and lighter presentations of Carnatic music.

Film Songs

Language:Tamil

References 

Hindustani ragas